Antigius butleri  is a small butterfly found in the East Palearctic (Amur, Korea, North China) that belongs to the lycaenids or blues family.

Description from Seitz

Above like A. attilia, but the pale spots on the hindwing, which in attilia are only found in the female, occur in the present species in both sexes, although they are duller in the male
than in the female. The characteristic markings of the underside are slightly visible above and are more irregularly arranged beneath, especially on the hindwing, the dark discal band moreover being separated into an irregular  row of spots; thus butleri forms a kind of link between enthea and ottilia. — Amurland and North Japan, apparently rare everywhere.

Subspecies
A. b. butleri Japan (Hokkaido)
A. b. oberthueri (Staudinger, 1887) continental part, Ussuri, Priamurye, Primorye, 
A. b. miniakonga (Yoshino, 1999) Sichuan

See also
List of butterflies of Russia

References

Theclini